Wayne David MP (born 1 July 1957) is a British politician who has served as Member of Parliament (MP) for Caerphilly since 2001. A member of the Labour Party, he was Leader of the European Parliamentary Labour Party from 1994 to 1998 and a Member of the European Parliament (MEP) from 1989 to 1999. As an MEP, he represented South Wales from 1989 to 1994 and South Wales Central from 1994 to 1999.

David served in government as an Assistant Whip from 2007 to 2008 and Parliamentary Under-Secretary of State for Wales from 2008 to 2010. He was a Shadow Minister under every Leader of the Opposition from 2010 to 2021, and Parliamentary Private Secretary to Ed Miliband during his tenure in the role. He was ranked as the best MP in the United Kingdom by constituents in Change.org's People-Power Index in 2019.

Early life and education
David was born in Bridgend, the son of a teacher and grandson of a coal miner. He grew up in the local village of Cefn Cribwr and later attended Cynffig Comprehensive School before attending University College, Cardiff, where he was awarded a BA in History and Welsh History in 1979. After studying Economic History at University College, Swansea, he returned to Cardiff and qualified as a teacher in 1983 with a PGCE from University College Cardiff. He was awarded the Charles Morgan Prize for Welsh history in 1979.

Professional career
David taught history at the Brynteg Comprehensive School, Bridgend from 1983 to 1985, when he left to work for the Workers' Educational Association. He became the chairman of War on Want Cymru in 1987, stepping aside in 1989. He joined the United Nations Association's Cardiff branch in 1989.

Political career
David was an elected representative on the Welsh Executive of the Labour Party from 1981 to 1982 and 1986 to 1989. He was served as a councillor to the Cefn Cribwr Community Council in 1985, and was its chairman from 1986 until 1990. He was a member of the Labour Party National Executive Committee from 1994 to 1998.

European Parliament
David was elected as Member of the European Parliament for South Wales in 1989, and re-elected to South Wales Central in 1994 following constituency boundary changes. He served as Leader of the European Parliamentary Labour Party from 1994 to 1998, and was previously treasurer of the group from 1989 to 1991.

He stood down to contest the Rhondda in the first National Assembly for Wales elections in 1999. David lost to the Plaid Cymru candidate by over 2,000 votes.

UK Parliament
David was elected as Member of the UK Parliament for Caerphilly for at the 2001 general election, succeeding former Welsh Secretary Ron Davies in the safe Labour seat. He made his maiden speech on 17 June 2001, in which he called for a new hospital in his constituency.

David was a member of the European Scrutiny Committee from 2001 to 2007. In 2005, he was appointed as Parliamentary Private Secretary (PPS) to the Ministry of Defence team and then subsequently to Adam Ingram, Minister of State for the Armed Forces. He resigned as a PPS on 6 September 2006, along with a number of others, citing Prime Minister Tony Blair's refusal to name a departure date.

After Gordon Brown became Prime Minister, David was appointed as an Assistant Whip to the Department for Work and Pensions and Wales Office in July 2007. Following the October 2008 government reshuffle, he was promoted to Parliamentary Under-Secretary of State for Wales.

Following Labour's defeat at the 2010 general election, he served as Shadow Wales Minister from May to October 2010. David was appointed Shadow Europe Minister in October 2011. He served as Shadow Political and Constitutional Reform Minister in the shadow Justice team from October 2011 until October 2013, when he became PPS to Ed Miliband.

In July 2015, he was appointed as a Shadow Minister for the Cabinet Office, Justice and Scotland. David was re-appointed to the three positions by opposition leader Jeremy Corbyn, but resigned in June 2016 after losing confidence in his leadership. He supported Owen Smith in his unsuccessful Labour leadership challenge in 2016, and re-joined the front bench as Shadow Armed Forces and Defence Procurement Minister the following October.

David briefly departed the front bench from January until April 2020, when he became Shadow Middle East and North Africa Minister. He stood down from the position in December 2021, and announced his intention retire at the next general election in February 2022. He chose to not to seek re-election due to his age.

Personal life
David was married to Catherine Thomas, a former Welsh Assembly Member, from 1991 until their divorce in 2007. He married Jayne Edwards in 2016.

Publications
Building on Maastricht: A Left Agenda for Europe by Wayne David, 1993, Tribune Group of Euro MPs
Going Forward in Europe by Wayne David, 1994
Contributor to The Future of Europe: Problems and Issues for the Twenty-First Century by Wayne David, 1996, St Martin's Press, 
Remaining True: A biography of Ness Edwards by Wayne David, Foreword by Neil Kinnock, 2006, Published by the Caerphilly Local History Society,

References

External links
Wayne David MP official constituency website
Profile at the Welsh Labour Party

 

|-

|-

|-

1957 births
Alumni of Cardiff University
Alumni of Swansea University
Welsh Labour Party MPs
Welsh Labour MEPs
Living people
MEPs for Wales 1989–1994
MEPs for Wales 1994–1999
People from Bridgend
UK MPs 2001–2005
UK MPs 2005–2010
UK MPs 2010–2015
UK MPs 2015–2017
UK MPs 2017–2019
UK MPs 2019–present